Martha Elizabeth Keys (born August 10, 1930) is an American retired politician who served in the U.S. House of Representatives from Kansas from 1975 to 1979.

Early life and education
Born in Hutchinson, Kansas, Keys graduated from Paseo High School in Kansas City, Missouri in 1945. She attended Olivet College from 1946 to 1947 and earned a Bachelor of Arts degree at the University of Missouri–Kansas City in 1951.

Career 
Keys was a Democratic campaigner in 1964 and 1968. She ran the McGovern presidential campaign in Kansas in 1972. When Bill Roy retired from the U.S. Congress she was persuaded to run for the seat by her brother-in-law, Senator Gary Hart, a Colorado Democrat.

She was elected a Democrat to the United States House of Representatives from Manhattan, Kansas in 1974 and served two terms before being defeated for reelection in 1978. While serving in the House of Representatives, Keys and her husband divorced, and she was remarried to fellow Congressman Andrew Jacobs Jr. They separated in 1981 and eventually divorced.

She then served as a special adviser to the Secretary of Health, Education, and Welfare from February 1979 to May 1980 and as an assistant secretary of education from June 1980 to January 1981. In 1982, Keys was elected to the Common Cause National Governing Board. Afterwards, she worked as a consultant and as director of the Center for a New Democracy from 1985 to 1986.

Personal life 
She married Sam Keys, a university professor and, later, dean of the College of Education at Kansas State University. Keys's sister, Lee, was married to former U.S. Senator and presidential candidate Gary Hart until her death in 2021.

See also
 Women in the United States House of Representatives

References

External links

 Women in Congress: Martha Keys

1930 births
Living people
Female members of the United States House of Representatives
University of Missouri alumni
Politicians from Hutchinson, Kansas
Politicians from Manhattan, Kansas
Women in Kansas politics
Democratic Party members of the United States House of Representatives from Kansas
21st-century American women